Qu'Appelle was a territorial electoral district for the Legislative Assembly of Northwest Territories, Canada.

The riding was created as a single member electoral district by royal proclamation in 1883. In 1885 the riding was mandated to return two members to the Assembly. In 1888 the riding was split into North Qu'Appelle and South Qu'Appelle. The redistribution was caused by the North-West Representation Act 1880 passing through the Parliament of Canada.

Members of the Legislative Assembly (MLAs)

Election results

1884 election

1885 election
in 1885, the district elected two members. Each voter could cast up to two votes.

1886 election

1887 election

References

External links 
The Legislative Assembly of Northwest Territories

Former electoral districts of Northwest Territories